Reanna is a given name. Notable people with the name include:

 Reanna Browne (born 1983), Australian former cricketer
 Reanna Solomon (1981–2022), Nauruan weightlifter

Feminine given names